The Peace and Justice Studies Association (PJSA) is a non-profit organization headquartered at Georgetown University in Washington, DC.

It was created following increased interest in peace-building after the September 11th attacks in USA, and it organizes annual conferences, publishes papers and a magazine, and issues awards for peace-builders.

Organization 
Following increased academic interest in conflict and conflict-resolution after the September 11th attack, the Consortium on Peace Research, Education and Development and the Peace Studies Association merged to form the Peace and Justice Studies Association. It is the North American regional affiliate of the International Peace Research Association.

The association grew in size through the early 2000s, and since 2016, the executive director has been Michael Loadenthal.

Activities 
The organization organizes the annual Peace and Justice Studies Association Conference, issues the Peacebuilder of the Year award, and publishes the Peace Chronicle magazine.

References

External links
Matyók, T. (2011). Pursuing Just Peace: An Overview and Case Studies for Faith-Based Peacebuilders [Review]. Peace & Change, 36(2), 297-299. doi: 10.1111/j.1468- 0130.2010.00695.x
Official website
Bridge Connect Act
Higher Education Consortium for Urban Affairs (HECUA)
Center for Global Education, Augsburg College

Organizations established in 2001
Non-profit organizations based in Washington, D.C.
Peace organizations based in the United States
Learned societies of the United States
2001 establishments in Washington, D.C.